|}

The Victor Ludorum Juvenile Hurdle is a National Hunt hurdle race in England which is open to horses aged four years only. 
It is run at Haydock Park over a distance of about 1 mile 7½ furlongs (1 mile, 7 furlongs and 144 yards, or ), and during its running there are 9 flights of hurdles to be jumped. It is scheduled to take place each year in February.

The race was first run in 1962 and was classified as a Listed race in the 1980s.  It was run as a Limited handicap from 1995 to 2001.

Winners

See also 
 Horseracing
 List of British National Hunt races

References
Racing Post
 Timeform Chasers & Hurdlers Statistical Companion 1992–93

National Hunt hurdle races
National Hunt races in Great Britain
Haydock Park Racecourse
Recurring sporting events established in 1962